The 1995 Senior British Open was a professional golf tournament for players aged 50 and above and the ninth British Senior Open Championship, held from 27 to 30 July at Royal Portrush Golf Club in Portrush, County Antrim, Northern Ireland, United Kingdom.

In 2018, the tournament was, as all Senior British Open Championships played 1987–2002, retroactively recognized as a senior major golf championship and a PGA Tour Champions (at the time named the Senior PGA Tour) event.

Brian Barnes won in a playoff over Bob Murphy to win his first Senior British Open title and first senior major championship victory.

Venue

The event was the first Senior Open Championship held at Royal Portrush Golf Club.

Field
133 players entered the competition. 65 players, all of them professionals, no amateurs, made the 36-hole cut.

Past champions in the field
Six past Senior British Open champions participated. Six of them made the 36-hole cut. Bobby Verway withdraw.

Past winners and runners-up at The Open Championship in the field 
The field included three former winners of The Open Championship, Bob Charles (tied 3rd), Gary Player (tied 24th) and Arnold Palmer (tied 32nd).

The field also included three former runners-up at The Open Championship; Brian Huggett (10th), Neil Coles (tied 15th) and Christy O'Connor Snr (tied 39th).

Final round and playoff summaries

Final round
Sunday, 30 July 1995

Brian Barnes and Bob Murphy tied the lead after the fourth round, to meet in a sudden death playoff, to decide the winner.

Defending champion Tom Wargo finished 12th nine strokes behind the leaders.

Playoff
Sunday, 30 July 1995

The sudden-death playoff, to be played until one of the players had a lower score on a hole than the other, went on to the par-5 17th hole, then the par-4 18th hole and then the 17th hole again. 50-year-old Brian Barnes beat Bob Murphy with an eagle at the third extra hole.

References

External links 
 Results on European Tour website

Senior major golf championships
Golf tournaments in Northern Ireland
Senior British Open
Senior British Open
Senior British Open